Martin Andersen (born 7 November 1986) is a Danish retired professional football (soccer) midfielder.

Later career
After leaving HIK in the summer 2020, Andersen began playing for Denmark Series club Hørsholm-Usserød IK. In February 2022, he was also hired as the club's sponsorship manager alongside his work as a player.

References

External links
 
 
 

1986 births
Living people
Danish men's footballers
Danish expatriate men's footballers
Lyngby Boldklub players
Ängelholms FF players
Danish Superliga players
Danish 1st Division players
Danish 2nd Division players
Superettan players
Brabrand IF players
FC Roskilde players
Hellerup IK players
Association football midfielders
People from Allerød Municipality
FC Djursland players
Expatriate footballers in Sweden
Danish expatriate sportspeople in Sweden
Allerød FK players
Sportspeople from the Capital Region of Denmark